Nan is a town in northern Thailand. It is in the centre of  Nan Province which bears its name, and of which it is the former administrative capital. It covers tambon Nai Wiang and parts of tambon Pha Sing of Mueang Nan District, an area of  divided into 30 chumchon. In 2010 it had a population of 21,333 spread along the Nan River's right bank. Nan is a small city, primarily devoted to commercial, administrative, educational, and hospital activities. The old heart of the city, where Wat Phumin, the national museum and other tourist attractions are found, is being restored.

History
Nan for centuries was a separate, autonomous kingdom with few relationships with the outside world. There is evidence of prehistoric habitation, but it wasn't until several small mueang united to form Nanthaburi on the Nan River in the mid-14th century, contemporaneously with the creation of Luang Prabang and the Lan Xang (Million Elephants) kingdom in Laos, that the city became notable. Associated with the Sukhothai Kingdom, the mueang took the title Wara Nakhon and played a significant part in the development of early Thai nationalism.

By the end of the 14th century Nan was one of the nine northern Thai-Lao principalities that formed Lanna. The city-state flourished throughout the 15th century under the name Chiang Klang ('middle city'), a reference to its position roughly midway between Chiang Mai ('new city') and Chiang Thong ('golden city'), today's Luang Prabang).

The Burmese took control of the kingdom in 1558 and deported many of the inhabitants to Burma as slaves; the city was deserted until northern Thailand was retaken from the Burmese in 1786. The local dynasty then regained local sovereignty and it remained semi-autonomous until 1931 when Nan finally accepted full Bangkok dominion. Part of its territory had been annexed to Laos by the French in the late-19th century.

Parts of the old city wall and several early wats dating from the Lanna period can be seen in contemporary Nan. The city's wats are distinctive; some temple structures show Lanna influence, while others belong to the Thai Lue legacy brought from Xishuangbanna in China, where the Thai Lue people originated.

Climate

Culture 
Wat Phumin is the city's most well-known wat. It is located near the Nan National Museum. The fifteenth century Wat Phra That Khao Noi overlooks the city and the golden Phra Buddha Maha Udom Mongkhon Nanthaburi, Sri Nan is enshrined there. The city has a lak muang (city pillar), Wat Ming Mueang, at the center of the city.

Gallery

References

Further reading

External links

Tourism Authority of Thailand: Nan
Oriental Architecture profile - photos of 12 sites in Nan with GPS calibrated map

Populated places in Nan province
Cities and towns in Thailand